Gogineni is an Indian patronymic surname. Notable people with the surname include:

 Gogineni Babu, Hyderabad-based Humanist and Rationalist
 N. G. Ranga or Gogineni Ranganayukulu, Indian freedom fighter and eminent Parliamentarian

Indian surnames
Patronymic surnames